Samuel Cabot Incorporated is a manufacturer of wood stain and other wood finishes.  It was founded by Samuel Cabot IV in 1877 and remained privately held until it was acquired by the Valspar Corporation in 2005.  Its best-known brand is Cabot Stain.

Its headquarters are in Newburyport, Massachusetts.

History
Samuel Cabot IV studied chemistry at M.I.T. and Zurich Polytechnic (now ETH Zurich).  After visiting factories in Europe, he was inspired to work on coal tar-based products.  He set up a laboratory in Chelsea, Massachusetts and his brother Godfrey joined him in 1882. They produced household disinfectant, sheep dip, wood preservatives, and shingle stain using coal tar that was a by-product of the gas works in Boston. They later bought a factory in Worthington, Pennsylvania which produced lampblack for making ink from natural gas.

The Pennsylvania factory later shut down because of insufficient gas, and Godfrey proposed to move the plant to nearby Kittanning.  Samuel declined to invest in this venture and Godfrey bought out Samuel's interest in the Pennsylvania operations.  Samuel's part of the company continued as Samuel Cabot Incorporated, and Godfrey's became Cabot Corporation.

Notes

External links

Manufacturing companies based in Massachusetts
Manufacturing companies established in 1877
American companies established in 1877
1877 establishments in Massachusetts
Companies based in Newburyport, Massachusetts
2005 mergers and acquisitions
Paint and coatings companies of the United States